Lulanguru is a village in Tanzania's Tabora Region.

See also 

 Transport in Tanzania

References 

Populated places in Tabora Region